John McCaig Bolton (26 October 1941 – 22 February 2021) was a Scottish footballer who played for Raith Rovers (two spells), Ipswich Town, Morton and Dumbarton.

References

1941 births
2021 deaths
Scottish footballers
Dumbarton F.C. players
Raith Rovers F.C. players
Greenock Morton F.C. players
Ipswich Town F.C. players
Scottish Football League players
English Football League players
People from Lesmahagow
Association football defenders